The Piteşti Sud Power Station is a large thermal power plant located in Piteşti, having 2 generation groups of 50 MW each and 3 groups of 12 MW having a total electricity generation capacity of 136 MW.

See also

 List of power stations in Romania

References

External links
Official site 

Natural gas-fired power stations in Romania
Coal-fired power stations in Romania